Paratanaoidea is a superfamily of malacostracan crustacean.

Families 
According to the World Register of Marine Species, the following families are accepted within Paratanaoidea:

 Agathotanaidae Lang, 1971
 Akanthophoreidae Sieg, 1986
 Anarthruridae Lang, 1971
 Colletteidae Larsen & Wilson, 2002
 Cryptocopidae Sieg, 1977
 Hamatipedidae Błażewicz, Gellert & Bird, 2022
 Heterotanoididae Bird, 2012
 Leptocheliidae Lang, 1973
 Leptognathiidae Sieg, 1976
 Mirandotanaidae Błażewicz-Paszkowycz & Bamber, 2009
 Nototanaidae Sieg, 1976
 Paranarthrurellidae Błażewicz, Jóźwiak & Frutos, 2019
 Paratanaidae Lang, 1949
 Pseudotanaidae Sieg, 1976
 Pseudozeuxidae Sieg, 1982
 Tanaellidae Larsen & Wilson, 2002
 Tanaissuidae Bird & Larsen, 2009
 Tanaopsidae Błażewicz-Paszkowycz & Bamber, 2012
 Teleotanaidae Bamber, 2008
 Typhlotanaidae Sieg, 1984

The following genera are regarded as Paratanaoidea incertae sedis, meaning their familial placement is uncertain:

 Andrognathia Sieg, 1983
 Androtanais Sieg, 1976
 Armaturatanais Larsen, 2005
 Bifidia Sieg & Zibrowius, 1988
 Coalecerotanais Larsen, 2003
 Cristatotanais Kudinova-Pasternak, 1990
 Exspina Lang, 1968
 Gejavis Błażewicz-Paszkowycz & Bamber, 2012
 Insociabilitanais Larsen, 2005
 Kanikipa Bird, 2011
 Leptognathioides Bird & Holdich, 1984
 Monstrotanais Kudinova-Pasternak, 1981
 Parafilitanais Kudinova-Pasternak, 1989
 Portaratrum Guerrero-Kommritz, 2003
 Pseudoarthrura Larsen, 2005
 Pseudomacrinella Kudinova-Pasternak, 1990
 Pseudoparatanais Lang, 1973
 Robustochelia Kudinova-Pasternak, 1983
 Safaritanais Kudinova-Pasternak, 1987
 Salemia Lang, 1971
 Selvagentanais Larsen, 2013
 Singula Blazewicz-Paszkowycz, 2005
 Tanabnormia Gutu, 1986
 Tangalooma Bamber, 2008
 Unispinosus Chim & Tong, 2020

References 

Tanaidacea
Crustaceans described in 1949